The King of Love My Shepherd Is is an 1868 hymn with lyrics written by Henry Williams Baker, based on the Welsh version of Psalm 23 and the work of Edmund Prys. It is sung to four different melodies: Dominus Regit Me, the traditional Irish tune St. Columba, "Ich dank' dir schon" by Michael Praetorius, and Remsen, the Welsh original. Henry Baker's last words were reportedly lyrics from this hymn. In 1997, the hymn was sung at the funeral of Diana, Princess of Wales.

Lyrics

References

English Christian hymns
1868 songs